

The Besson H-6 was a French single-seat postal flying-boat designed by the Marcel Besson company of Boulogne.

Development
The H-6 was a single-seat triplane flying-boat powered by a Clerget 9B radial piston engine. The engine was mounted on the leading edge of the centre wing and drove a tractor propeller.

The H-6 was displayed at the 1921 Salon de l'Aeronautique in Paris.

Specifications

See also

References

Notes

Bibliography

Flying boats
1920s French mailplanes
H-6
Single-engined tractor aircraft
Triplanes
Aircraft first flown in 1921
Rotary-engined aircraft